Cyanothamnus defoliatus is a plant in the citrus family, Rutaceae and is endemic to the south-west of Western Australia. It is a straggly shrub with simple, thread-like leaves and white to pink, four-petalled flowers that are pale blue on the back.

Description
Its branches and leaves are glabrous. The eight stamens have woolly hairs and the style is thin with a minute stigma. Flowering occurs from September to October.

Taxonomy and naming
This species was first formally described in 1875 by Ferdinand von Mueller who gave it the name Boronia defoliata in Fragmenta phytographiae Australiae. The type specimen was collected by James Drummond. In a 2013 paper in the journal Taxon, Marco Duretto and others changed the name to Cyanothamnus defoliatus on the basis of cladistic analysis. The specific epithet (defoliatus) means "without leaves".

Distribution and habitat
Cyanothamnus defoliatus grows in sand, gravel and laterite between Capel and  Manjimup in the  Jarrah Forest, Mallee, Swan Coastal Plain and Warren biogeographic regions.

Conservation
Cyanothamnus defoliatus is classified as "not threatened" by the Western Australian Government Department of Parks and Wildlife.

References

defoliatus
Flora of Western Australia
Plants described in 1875
Taxa named by Ferdinand von Mueller